Wraight is a surname. Notable people with the surname include:

Gary Wraight (born 1979), English footballer
Megan Wraight (1961–2020), New Zealand landscape architect

See also
Dolly Walker-Wraight (1920–2002), British schoolteacher and writer
Wright